Nagarkurnool is a town in Nagarkurnool district of the Indian state of Telangana.

Election results

General Election, 2014

References 

Census towns in Nagarkurnool district
Nagarkurnool district
Mandals in Nagarkurnool district